Calderstones or Calderstone may refer to:
Calderstones Park, a park in the Allerton suburb of Liverpool, England
Calderstones House, a mansion in the park
Calderstones School, a comprehensive school near the park
Calderstone Productions, a record company that administers recordings by The Beatles
Calderstones Partnership NHS Foundation Trust, a former hospital and health services provider in Whalley, Lancashire, England
Calderstone Middle School, Brampton, Ontario, Canada, operated by the Peel District School Board